The 2021 mayoral election in Harrisburg, Pennsylvania was held on November 2, 2021. Two-term incumbent mayor Eric Papenfuse, a member of the Democratic Party, ran for a third term, but lost re-nomination to City Council President Wanda Williams. On September 15, 2021, Papenfuse formally announced that he would run a write-in campaign in the November General Election. Williams won the general election against Papenfuse by more than a 2–1 margin.

Background 
Eric Papenfuse was first elected mayor of Harrisburg in 2013. He was re-elected to a second term in 2017.

Democratic primary

Candidates

Nominee 
 Wanda Williams, City Council President

Eliminated in primary 
 Eric Papenfuse, incumbent Mayor
 Otto Banks, former City Councilman
 Kevyn Knox, General Manager of Harrisburg Midtown Arts Center
 Dave Schankweiler, businessman

Withdrew 

 Lewis Butts Jr., Perennial candidate

Results

Republican primary

Candidates

Declared 

 Tim Rowbottom, businessman

Results

General election

Results

See also 

 2021 United States elections
 List of mayors of Harrisburg, Pennsylvania

References

External links
Official campaign websites

2021
Harrisburg
2021 Pennsylvania elections